Seaforth Dock (also known as the Royal Seaforth Dock) is a purpose-built dock and container terminal, on the River Mersey, England, at Seaforth, to the north of Liverpool. As part of the Port of Liverpool and Liverpool Freeport, it is operated by the Mersey Docks and Harbour Company. Situated at the northern end of the dock system, it is connected to Gladstone Dock to the south, which via its lock entrance provides maritime access to Seaforth Dock from the river.

History
Despite planning permission having been obtained almost sixty years previously, work commenced during the 1960s on Liverpool's largest dock facility. In part the work was intended to reconstruct or compensate for damage suffered during World War II.

Technological changes, such as containerization, caused the loss of numerous jobs on the docks. In the 21st century, the dock handles mainly containers, oils, timber, fruit and vegetables, grain and animal feed. The dock became a free port in 1984.

A fruit and vegetable terminal opened at the dock in 2008. The terminal primarily received produce from Spain. However, this facility closed in 2013.

Wind turbines 
In 1999, Peel Energy installed six Vestas V44-600 kW wind turbines along the river wall for a total nameplate capacity of 3.6MW.

Rail connection 
Seaforth Dock is served by one rail line, the Canada Dock branch line. The Olive Mount rail chord at Edge Hill junction was re-opened early 2009 to increase the throughput of the service to Seaforth Dock, giving direct access for freight from the Port of Liverpool to the West Coast Main Line. In May 2016 it was announced that the line's final section into the dock estate would be upgraded to double track from single track to increase capacity to the port. Combined with improved signalling at Earlestown, the improvements will enable up to 48 trains a day to enter the port. Work on the line is expected to be completed by 2019.

Liverpool2
Liverpool2 is a Post-Panamax container terminal extension which opened in November 2016 as an expansion to Seaforth dock.

Gallery

References

Sources

Further reading

External links

 Peel Ports - Liverpool

Liverpool docks
Container terminals
Wind farms in England